The Australian Standard Garratt (ASG) was a Garratt steam locomotive designed in Australia during World War II, and used on  narrow gauge railway systems in Queensland, South Australia, Western Australia and Tasmania.

History
With the outbreak of World War II, in 1939 the Federal Government formed the Commonwealth Land Transport Board (CLTB) to take responsibility for the country's land transport networks. It had the power to override the decisions of the State railways. In 1942, the CLTB appointed the Commissioner of Railways in Western Australia, Joseph Ellis, to investigate the capacity of Australia's narrow gauge network and recommend what locomotives should be purchased. Ellis recommended that three variations of Garratt locomotive be purchased; heavy, medium and light.

The CLTB elected to build only the light type to allow it to operate on any narrow gauge line in Australia. After an attempt to obtain drawings and licenses from Beyer, Peacock and Company failed, in July 1942 the CLTB recommended to the War Cabinet that 30 locomotives be built locally. In August 1942, the War Cabinet approved the order, this was increased to 65 locomotives in November 1942. The Western Australian Government Railways' Chief Mechanical Engineer Frederick Mills was seconded to lead a team of engineers in Melbourne to design the new locomotive. The Queensland Railways were vocal opponents, stating its preference for a modified version of its C17 class.

The result was the Australian Standard Garratt, with the first locomotive being built in a record breaking four months to enter service in September 1943. Only 57 ASGs were completed, with assembly of the remaining eight cancelled at the end of the war. The locomotives were built by the WAGR's Midland Railway Workshops (10), the Victorian Railways' Newport Workshops (12), the South Australian Railways' Islington Railway Workshops (13), and Clyde Engineering, Sydney (22).

In service

Because of differences between the states, especially in regard to loading gauges, the sharpness of curves, and axle load, especially in Queensland, the design had to be a compromise, which went against the idea of having a standardised design.

To enable the long-wheelbase engine units to negotiate sharp curves, the leading driving wheels were designed to be flangeless, but this proved to be a major flaw as it led to a tendency for the locomotives to derail on curves and points. Another key problem, which made the ASGs unpopular with locomotive crews, was the fact that the firebox door opened flat on the floor of the driving cab, maximising heat radiation into the crew compartment. This resulted in them having fairly short lives with most withdrawn by the mid-1950s. Some were resold for use on the Emu Bay and Fyansford Cement Works Railways where they would have more successful careers.

Queensland Railways
The Queensland Railways purchased 23. One was never used and another saw only two months service. In September 1945, the drivers' union placed a ban on them. Attempts to modify them proved unsuccessful, and they were written off in 1948. Three were sold to the Emu Bay Railway and six to the Tasmanian Government Railways, with the remainder scrapped in 1954/55.

Tasmanian Government Railways
The Tasmanian Government Railways purchased 14 new and another six second-hand from the Queensland Railways. Two were sold to the Emu Bay Railway with the remainder scrapped in the late 1950s.

Western Australian Government Railways
The Western Australian Government Railways purchased 25. They were unpopular with crews, and their use through the state's only tunnel at Swan View caused serious problems, resulting in deaths, industrial disputes, and a Royal Commission.

Six were sold to the South Australian Railways in 1952 with the last withdrawn from the WAGR in January 1957.

Emu Bay Railway
The Emu Bay Railway purchased three second-hand from the Queensland Railways and two from the Tasmanian Government Railways. It would operate them successfully until the mid-1960s. One was destroyed in an accident in February 1962 with a replacement obtained from the TGR.

South Australian Railways
In 1952, the South Australian Railways purchased six second-hand from the WAGR to haul lead ore between Cockburn and Port Pirie as an interim solution pending the delivery of the 400 class Garratts, with all condemned by February 1956.

Fyansford Cement Works Railway
The Fyansford Cement Works Railway purchased G33 from Commonwealth Disposals in August 1945. It was withdrawn in 1957, but maintained in operational condition until the railway closed in 1966 when it was donated to the Geelong division of the Australian Railway Historical Society.

Class list

Preservation
The only surviving complete ASG is G33, which ran on the Fyansford Cement Works Railway until 1957. It was on static display at the Australian Railway Historical Society Museum in North Williamstown until May 2013, when (along with a spare boiler) it was moved by road to the Bellarine Railway, Queenscliff, with the aim of full restoration.

Many front ASG water tanks have survived: one at Yatina, South Australia, two on a farm south of Peterborough, South Australia, one at the Workshops Rail Museum in Queensland, two at the Don River Railway in Tasmania, and several dotted around that state. They were used as water tanks for steam and fire fighting until the early 1980s. Another also survives with the Launceston & North East Railway in Launceston, Tasmania. It was used as a waste oil tank by TasRail until the closure of the Hobart railway yard in 2014, possibly being the last steam engine component used by TasRail.

References

Bibliography

Further reading

External links

Operating Manual for Australian Standard Garratt
Forum discussion of whereabouts of former ASG tanks

Clyde Engineering locomotives
Garratt locomotives
Railway locomotives introduced in 1943
Garatt
Steam locomotives of Queensland
Steam locomotives of Tasmania
Steam locomotives of Western Australia
3 ft 6 in gauge locomotives of Australia
4-8-2+2-8-4 locomotives
Freight locomotives